Tappaya Sit Or or Mit Klinmee, is a former Rajadamnern and WMC champion with past rankings at Lumpini and Channel 7. Tappaya is currently retired from competition and runs the eponymous Sor Klinmee Gym in Pattaya, Thailand.

Biography and career

Early life
Tappaya is the youngest of 11 children and began training and fighting regularly at the age of 6 along with his brother, Yokthai Sit-Or, and nephew, Rambaa Somdet. The three would train before and after school. In the evenings, they would compete in a local bar for tips. Tappaya was fighting in Bangkok by age 12. The three moved from Petrungruang gym in Pattaya to join the original Sit Or camp in Pattaya at its founding and were the first name fighters produced by the gym. Sit Or has since moved to Bangkok and been home to such fighters as Nong-O Sit-Or and Petchmankong Petfergus.

Championship era
In 1997, he challenged and defeated Ankandet BaoBaoin for the 61.5 kg Rajadamnern belt. The bout was televised on Channel 5 in Thailand. Tappaya would hold the Rajadamnern belt for three consecutive years. Also in 1997, on August 10, he would win the WMC belt from Panmongkon Carryboy at 61.5 kg. He was ranked first at Lumpini Stadium, though he did not win the belt there. Tappaya became a high-profile fighter on Channel 7 during this time.

He ended his career with a record of 200 wins, 36 losses, and five draws, with a Rajadamnern and WMC belt at 61.5 kg, and a no.1 ranking at Lumpini.

Coaching
Toward the end of his fight career, he traveled to China, Japan, and the United Kingdom to teach and compete in Muay Thai. When he lived in Japan he competed in both kickboxing and MMA. He defeated Hayato in kickboxing rules fight as a representant of the Crosspoint Gym.

When he retired in 2001 Tappaya had plans to open his own gym, which he did in 2009. He is the owner and acting head trainer of Sor Klinmee Gym in Pattaya on Neung Phap Wan road.

Currently, Tappaya has two students regularly competing at the major stadiums in Bangkok. Robert Sor Klinmee is a southpaw fighter competing at 46 kg at Rajadamnern Stadium.  Sangpet Sor Klinmee is an orthodox fighter competing at 45.5 kg at Rajadamnern and Lumpini. Sinsamut Klinmee and his famous brother Sudsakorn Sor Klinmee train at Sor Klinmee Gym as does Yokthai's son, Thepprasit champion Fasai Sor Klinmee.

There are a number of younger boxers based out of the gym.

Titles & honours
Rajadamnern Stadium
 1997 Rajadamnern Stadium Lightweight (135 lbs) Champion
World Muay Thai Council
 1997 WMC World Lightweight Champion

Mixed martial arts record

|-
| Loss
| align=center| 0–1
| Taisho
| Submission (armbar)
| Deep 7 Impact
| 
| align=center| 1
| align=center| 4:36
| Tokyo, Japan
|

Muay Thai record

|- bgcolor="#CCFFCC"
| 2003-02-16 || Win ||align=left| HAYATO || IKUSA "YOUNG GUNNERS" || Tokyo, Japan || Decision (Majority) || 3 || 3:00
|- bgcolor="#fbb"
| 1999-09-05 || Loss ||align=left| Theparit Por.Tawatchai || Channel 7 Stadium || Bangkok, Thailand || Decision  || 5 || 3:00

|- bgcolor="#cfc"
| 1999-07-25 || Win ||align=left| Panmongkol Carryboy|| Channel 7 Stadium || Bangkok, Thailand || Decision  || 5 || 3:00

|-  style="background:#cfc;"
| 1998-11-01|| Win||align=left| Saifah Sor.Phannuch  || Channel 7 Stadium  || Bangkok, Thailand || Decision || 5 || 3:00

|- bgcolor="#fbb"
| 1997-12-06 || Loss ||align=left| Rungthong RatchadaMusicCafe|| Omnoi Stadium || Samut Sakhon, Thailand || Decision  || 5 || 3:00

|- bgcolor="#cfc"
| 1997-08-10 || Win ||align=left| Panmongkol Carryboy|| Channel 7 Stadium|| Bangkok, Thailand || Decision  || 5 || 3:00
|-
! style=background:white colspan=9 |

|- bgcolor="#cfc"
| 1997- || Win ||align=left| Ankarndej Por.Paoin|| Rajadamnern Stadium || Bangkok, Thailand || Decision  || 5 || 3:00
|-
! style=background:white colspan=9 |

|-  style="background:#fbb;"
| 1997-02-18|| Loss||align=left| Robert Kaennorasing || Channel 7 Stadium || Bangkok, Thailand || Decision  || 5 || 3:00

|-  style="background:#fbb;"
| 1996-10-27|| Loss||align=left| Robert Kaennorasing || Channel 7 Stadium || Bangkok, Thailand || Decision  || 5 || 3:00

|-  style="background:#cfc;"
| 1996-|| Win||align=left| Chanchai Sor Tamarangsri||   || Songkhla, Thailand || Decision || 5 || 3:00

|-  style="background:#fbb;"
| 1995-05-14|| Loss||align=left| Chanchai Sor Tamarangsri || Channel 7 Stadium  || Bangkok, Thailand || Decision || 5 || 3:00

|-  style="background:#cfc;"
| 1995-02-07|| Win||align=left| Dechpichit Kiattisak Sor.Por ||  Lumpinee Stadium || Bangkok, Thailand || Decision || 5 || 3:00

|-  style="background:#cfc;"
| 1995-01-01|| Win||align=left| BM Sasipraphayam  || Channel 7 Stadium  || Bangkok, Thailand || TKO (Doctor stoppage)|| 2 ||

|-  style="background:#fbb;"
| 1994-11-04|| Loss||align=left| Mantai Sakmethee ||  Lumpinee Stadium || Bangkok, Thailand || Decision || 5 || 3:00

|-  style="background:#cfc;"
| 1993-04-04|| Win||align=left| Saifah Sor.Phannuch  || Channel 7 Stadium  || Bangkok, Thailand || Decision || 5 || 3:00
|-
| colspan=9 | Legend:

References

External links
 Sit Or Gym Website, "About the Gym"
 Sor Klinmee Fighters Competing at Thepprasit and Rajadamnern
 Siam Fight Mag Report on Sit-Or, by Serge Trefeu, translated to English
 Siam Fight Mag report on Sit-Or, by Serge Trefeu, in original French

Living people
Tappaya Sit-Or
Tappaya Sit-Or
1976 births